Joseph "Joe" James Quinn (25 December 1864 – 12 November 1940) was an Australian second baseman who played 17 seasons in Major League Baseball. Born in Ipswich, Queensland, to Patrick Quinn and Catherine, née McAfee, both from Ireland, he was the only Australian-born player to reach the major leagues until Craig Shipley in 1986.

Career
Quinn started his career in 1884 with the Union Association's St. Louis Maroons, which won the pennant. He was one of few players from that league to later find success in the National League. Throughout his career, Quinn was known for his defensive skills, and he led NL second basemen in fielding percentage twice.

Quinn also had two stints as a big league manager, with the St. Louis Browns in 1895 and the Cleveland Spiders in 1899. His Browns club went 11–28 under his guidance, and the Spiders were even worse, going 12–104. His career .148 winning percentage is one of the lowest in baseball history.

He was, as a player, arguably the best hitter on the Spiders team that he managed, which is considered to have been the worst team in major league history.

He umpired two games; one each in 1894 and 1896.

In the offseason, Quinn was a mortician, and he owned a funeral home after his playing days ended. He died at age 77 in St. Louis, Missouri.

Quinn was inducted into the Baseball Australia Hall of Fame on 4 May 2013.

In 2014, the Australian sports writer Rochelle Llewelyn Nicholls published a biography of Joe "Undertaker" Quinn as Joe Quinn – Among the Rowdies.

See also
 List of Major League Baseball player–managers
 List of St. Louis Cardinals team records
 List of Major League Baseball players from Australia

References
Notes

Sources

External links
, or Retrosheet

Joe Quinn, Campbelltown Library, 17 July 2013

1864 births
1940 deaths
Australian expatriate baseball players in the United States
Australian people of Irish descent
Sportspeople from Ipswich, Queensland
19th-century baseball players
Major League Baseball players from Australia
Major League Baseball second basemen
Minor league baseball managers
Baltimore Orioles (NL) players
Boston Beaneaters players
Boston Reds (PL) players
Cincinnati Reds players
Cleveland Spiders players
St. Louis Browns players
St. Louis Cardinals players
St. Louis Maroons players
Washington Senators (1901–1960) players
Cleveland Spiders managers
Duluth Freezers players
Des Moines Prohibitionists players
Des Moines Midgets players
Des Moines Undertakers players
Major League Baseball player-managers
Burials at Calvary Cemetery (St. Louis)
American funeral directors